decoat  Rambabu Gadariya

1.

Plot
A group of hunters come into a dense forest to recover a hidden treasure. Dacoit Aiappan captures this forest and is also searching for those valuable treasures. A jungle lady Bela confronts and restrains them from doing further wrong.

Cast
 Hemant Birje
 Joginder as Aiappan
 Sapna (actress) as Bela
 Shiva Rindani
 Anil Nagrath as Tribal leader
 Amit Pachori
 Birbal
 Gur Bachchan Singh
 Ali Khan
 Satnam Kaur
 Nisha Kamat
 Romesh Goel
 Pinky Chinoy

References

External links
 

2001 films
2000s action adventure films
2000s Hindi-language films
Indian action adventure films
Indian erotic films
Tarzan films